Dorothy Tait, (March 1, 1901, Cambridge, Massachusetts – February 8, 1972, Monterey, California) better known by her pen name, Ann Fairbairn, was an American author. She wrote Five Smooth Stones, published in 1966, which was her best-known work. Fairbairn also wrote That Man Cartwright, which was published in 1970. 

Tait attended Leland Powers School in Boston. She lived in New Orleans for many years and, for two and a half years, lived in Rio de Janeiro. She began work as a feature editor and a newspaper reporter.

While living in New Orleans, Tait managed the American and international tours of jazz clarinetist George Lewis's band for more than a decade. In 1961 her biography, "Call Him George," was published in London by Peter Davies Ltd., under the pen name Jay Allison Stuart. It was published in the United States by Crown Publishers in 1969, crediting authorship to Ann Fairbairn. 

Tait's experience with Lewis inspired her to write "Five Smooth Stones."

Tait was highly guarded about details of her personal life. She was widowed twice. The names of her husbands are not known. She had no children.

Works 
 Call Him George, 1961
 Five Smooth Stones, 1966
 That Man Cartwright, 1970

References 

1972 deaths
1901 births
20th-century American writers
20th-century American women writers
Pseudonymous women writers
Writers from Cambridge, Massachusetts
20th-century pseudonymous writers